Everybody's Business,  is a 2013 Singaporean comedy film directed by Lee Thean-jeen. The film centres around public hygiene and cleanliness in toilets.

Plot
John Lu is a hygiene officer for the newly-created Minister of Toilets, headed by Kumari Kuppusamy. He and his boss Winston Li need to get to the bottom of a toilet hygiene problem that has caused 50 Singaporeans to get food poisoning.

Cast
 Gurmit Singh as John Lu
 Mark Lee as Winston Li
 Kumar as Kumari Kuppusamy
 Wang Lei as Mr. Wong
 Liu Ling Ling as Mrs. Wong

Release
The film was released in theatres on 5 December 2013.

Reception
Charlene Chua of The New Paper gave the film three stars out of five. Yip Wai Yee of The Straits Times gave the film one and a half stars out of five, stating, "There are the rare moments when the film makes some keen observations about government campaigns, including how they always seem to incorporate a catchy ditty that everyone loves to hate, but such moments are few and far between."

References

External links
 

2013 films
Singaporean comedy films
2010s English-language films